Fuentenava de Jábaga is a municipality in Cuenca, Castile-La Mancha, Spain. As of 2020, it had a population of 489.

References

External links

Municipalities in the Province of Cuenca